Nozomi Tsuchida (born 19 August 1986) is a Japanese female volleyball player. She is part of the Japan women's national volleyball team. 
She participated at the 2015 FIVB World Grand Prix.
At the club level she played for Ageo Medics in 2015.

References 

Japanese women's volleyball players
1986 births
Living people
People from Fussa, Tokyo
Sportspeople from Nagasaki Prefecture
Ageo Medics players